On 5 January 2015, two men, one strapped with a suicide vest, ambushed a border guard patrol in Arar, Saudi Arabia along the border of Iraq, killing two guards and injuring another. The guards were able to return fire and kill one of the terrorists and afterwards the suicide bomber detonated his vest.

See also
 2014 al-Dalwah attack
 List of terrorist incidents, 2015

References

ISIL terrorist incidents in Saudi Arabia
Terrorist incidents in Saudi Arabia in 2015
Suicide bombings in Saudi Arabia
2015 murders in Saudi Arabia